The Democratic Socialist Party was a political party in Argentina formed in 1959 as a division of the Socialist Party.

The most important figure of the PSD was Alfredo Bravo, a teacher and civil rights activist, which was a deputy and the presidential candidate of the Socialist Party in the 2003 election.

The party joined the Popular Socialist Party in 2002 to form the Socialist Party.

See also

Politics of Argentina
Socialist Party (Argentina)

Socialist parties in Argentina
Defunct political parties in Argentina
Political parties established in 1959
1959 establishments in Argentina
Political parties disestablished in 2002
2002 disestablishments in Argentina